Tiemenguan is a county-level city in Xinjiang, People's Republic of China.

The city was formerly the settled and cultivated areas of the Second Agricultural Division of the Xinjiang Production and Construction Corps (XPCC), which were converted to a city in December 2012, when the State Council of China approved the establishment of Tiemenguan City. It is the sixth city in Xinjiang converted from XPCC land, after Shihezi, Aral, Tumxuk, Wujiaqu and Beitun. Like the other cities, it is a county-level city directly administered by Xinjiang Autonomous Region without an intervening prefectural government. The city is named after the nearby Iron Gate Pass (Tiemen Guan in Chinese).

The seat of the city is at the settlement of the 29th Regiment of the Second Division of XPCC. The settlement of the 28th Regiment has been named Boguqi Town, and that of the 30th Regiment, Shuangfeng Town. Both are under the administration of Tiemenguan.

References

County-level divisions of Xinjiang
2012 establishments in China
Xinjiang Production and Construction Corps
Populated places in Xinjiang